Tomáš Rezek (born 9 May 1984) is a professional Czech football player who currently plays for SK Převýšov.

References

External links
 
 Profile at Hradec Králové website

1984 births
Living people
Czech footballers
Czech First League players
FC Hradec Králové players

Association football midfielders